Axel Neumann (born 22 April 1952) is a German retired professional footballer who played professionally in the North American Soccer League.

A defender and midfielder, Neumann began his career with Tennis Borussia Berlin. In 1975, he moved to the United States and signed with the Boston Minutemen of the North American Soccer League. In 1977, he began the season with Team Hawaii. On 8 July 1977, he moved to the Las Vegas Quicksilvers.

References

External links
 NASL career stats
 

1952 births
Living people
Footballers from Berlin
Boston Minutemen players
California Surf players
German footballers
German expatriate footballers
Las Vegas Quicksilver players
North American Soccer League (1968–1984) players
San Diego Sockers (NASL) players
Team Hawaii players
Tennis Borussia Berlin players
Association football midfielders